The 2005–06 UAB Blazers men's basketball team represented the University of Alabama at Birmingham as a member of the Conference USA during the 2005–06 NCAA Division I men's basketball season. This was head coach Mike Anderson's fourth season at UAB, and the Blazers played their home games at Bartow Arena. They finished the season 24–7, 12–2 in C-USA play and lost in the semifinals of the C-USA tournament. They received an at-large bid to the NCAA tournament as No. 9 seed in the East region. The Blazers fell in the opening round to No. 8 seed Kentucky, 69–64.

Roster

Schedule and results

|-
!colspan=9 style=| Regular season

|-
!colspan=9 style=| C-USA tournament

|-
!colspan=9 style=| NCAA tournament

Rankings

References

UAB Blazers men's basketball seasons
UAB
UAB